Athleague is a village and a parish in the Diocese of Elphin on the River Suck in the west of Ireland in County Roscommon, near the town of Roscommon. 

Its church was founded sometime around 500 by Maenucan Atha Liacc ('Maonagán of Athleague'). The name is derived from Áth Liag ('the ford of the flagstones'), indicating its use as a crossing point between the kingdoms of the Uí Maine and Uí Briúin.

It is on the junction of the N63 national route and the R362 regional road. The R357 leaves the N63 south of the village. The town has a mill and a restored church. The church is the local parish for the surrounding towns. It is mentioned a number of times in the Annals of Connacht, the Annals of Lough Cé and the Annals of the Four Masters.

Cemetery
There were two graveyards in the parish of Athleague, one in the townland of Coolaspaddaun and one in that of Monasternalea. Monasternalea is sometimes referred to as Abbeygrey.

Townlands served by Athleague parish
The parish serves the townlands in County Galway that abut with County Roscommon.
Coalpits in County Galway
Coolaspaddaun with its cemetery
Hollygrove in County Galway
Monasternalea with its cemetery

Annalistic references
From the Annals of Inisfallen

 AI993.2 A naval raid by Brian, and he reached Breifne from Loch Rí by way of Áth Liac northwards.

Notable people
James Curley, Irish-American astronomer
Thomas Curley, American politician

See also
 List of towns and villages in Ireland

References

External links
Athleague parish records of birth, marriages and deaths at the National Library of Ireland

 
Towns and villages in County Roscommon